Fernando Guerrero De La Cruz (born 12 October 1986) is a Dominican-American middleweight professional boxer.

Early life
Guerrero was born in the Dominican Republic and also has Haitian roots from his father's side of the family. His parental grandfather's surname was Guerrier. He moved to Salisbury, Maryland as a youth and attended Parkside High School.

Amateur career
Guerrero began to get noticed at age 16, when he competed in competitions at the US National Junior Olympics and World Cadet Junior Olympics.  He defeated favored Shawn Porter. He won a silver medal at the 2006 National Golden Gloves Tournament and went on to win the National AAU championship at middleweight.  He defeated Shawn Porter and several other notable US Amateurs at the 2007 Golden Gloves tournament and for the 2007 US Championship; however, Porter won their final amateur encounter at the 2008 US Olympic trials, eventually losing to 2008 US Olympian Shawn Estrada.

Professional career
Guerrero has been featured on Showtime's ShoBox: The New Generation and ESPN's Friday Night Fights. On October 10, 2009, he won his first professional title in front of 5,000 hometown fans at an outdoor match with light rain earlier in the day and cool temperatures. Fernando Guerrero's manager and trainer is Hal Chernoff, co-trainer is Barry Hunter. Prize Fight Boxing, best known for promoting the largest pay-per-view boxing event in history through 2007 (Lewis vs. Tyson), is his promoter. Guerrero's hometown venue, the Wicomico Civic Center in Salisbury, holds the record for the largest crowd at a professional boxing match in the state of Maryland due to his hometown support.

Quillin vs. Guerrero 
Fernando Guerrero (25-1, 19 KO) secured his first world title shot against undefeated middleweight champion Peter Quillin (28-0, 20 KO) for the WBO middleweight title on April 27, 2013 on the undercard of Danny Garcia vs. Zab Judah. The title bout took place at the Barclays Center in Brooklyn, New York. Quillin started strong and scored two knockdowns in the second round while arguably dominating the first five rounds of the fight. In the sixth round Guerrero showed life as he was able to land good shots against Quillin. After a good sixth round by Guerrero, Quillin was able to end the fight by scoring two more knockdowns in the seventh round, resulting in the referee awarding Quillin the TKO victory.

Professional boxing record

| style="text-align:center;" colspan="8"|28 Wins (20 knockouts, 8 decisions), 4 Losses (4 knockouts, 0 decisions), 0 Draws
|-  style="text-align:center; background:#e3e3e3;"
|  style="border-style:none none solid solid; "|Res.
|  style="border-style:none none solid solid; "|Record
|  style="border-style:none none solid solid; "|Opponent
|  style="border-style:none none solid solid; "|Type
|  style="border-style:none none solid solid; "|Rd., Time
|  style="border-style:none none solid solid; "|Date
|  style="border-style:none none solid solid; "|Location
|  style="border-style:none none solid solid; "|Notes
|- align=center
|Loss
|28-4
|align=left| Tony Harrison
|
| 
|
|align=left| 
|align=left|
|- align=center
|Win
|28-3
|align=left| Daniel Souza Santos
|
| 
|
|align=left| 
|align=left|
|- align=center
|Win
|27-3
|align=left| Abraham Han
|
| 
|
|align=left| 
|align=left|
|- align=center
|Loss
|26-3
|align=left| David Lemieux
|
| 
|
|align=left| 
|align=left|
|- align=center
|Win
|26-2
|align=left| Raymond Gatica
|
| 
|
|align=left| 
|align=left|
|- align=center
|Loss
|25-2
|align=left| Peter Quillin
|
| 
|
|align=left| 
|align=left|
|- align=center
|Win
|25-1
|align=left| Juan Carlos Candelo
|
| 
|
|align=left| 
|align=left|
|- align=center
|Win
|24-1
|align=left| Jose Medina
|
| 
|
|align=left| 
|align=left|
|- align=center
|Win
|23-1
|align=left| Jason Naugler
|
| 
|
|align=left| 
|align=left|
|- align=center
|Win
|22-1
|align=left| Robert Kliewer
|
| 
|
|align=left| 
|align=left|
|- align=center
|Loss
|21-1
|align=left| Grady Brewer
|
| 
|
|align=left| 
|align=left|
|- align=center
|Win
|21-0
|align=left| Derrick Findley
|
| 
|
|align=left| 
|align=left|
|- align=center
|Win
|20-0
|align=left| Saul Duran
|
| 
|
|align=left| 
|align=left|
|- align=center
|Win
|19-0
|align=left| Ishe Smith
|
| 
|
|align=left| 
|align=left|

References

1986 births
Living people

Dominican Republic emigrants to the United States
Dominican Republic people of Haitian descent
Sportspeople of Haitian descent
American sportspeople of Dominican Republic descent
American sportspeople of Haitian descent
Boxers from Maryland
Middleweight boxers
American male boxers